is a Japanese former alpine skier who competed in the 1980 Winter Olympics and 1984 Winter Olympics.

External links
 sports-reference.com

1956 births
Living people
Japanese male alpine skiers
Olympic alpine skiers of Japan
Alpine skiers at the 1980 Winter Olympics
Alpine skiers at the 1984 Winter Olympics
Place of birth missing (living people)
20th-century Japanese people